The 1430s decade ran from January 1, 1430, to December 31, 1439.

Significant people

References

1430s